The Jordanian Central Command (Arabic:المنطقة العسكرية الوسطى) is the Jordanian Armed Forces regional command responsible for the main front against Israel.

History 
The Central Command was created after a major army reorganization in 1977. The units that make up the command were transferred from the former 4th Mechanized Division which was disbanded. The units of the command are currently deployed from Zarqa River, north of as-Salt to the Dead Sea in order to protect Jordan on its Israeli border.  In 2000 King Abdullah II initiated further restructuring of Jordanian Armed Forces when the remaining Divisions were transformed into lighter, more mobile forces, based largely on a brigade structure and considered better capable of rapid reaction in emergencies.

The old 4th Mechanised Division was deployed facing west in the sector from the Dead Sea to the Zarqa river north of Salt. The Jordan Valley, which forms the natural boundary between the two countries along this sector, is a deep, winding depression and the line of hills to the east of the valley forms a natural defensive line for Jordanian forces.

Jordanian forces have not been deployed in the Jordan Valley itself, where they would be vulnerable to Israeli air power and artillery. They were deployed on the heights above the valley in positions that enable them to obstruct any enemy movement up the routes to the central plateau leading to the main cities. There are a number of surfaced roads leading up to the top of the escarpment, about
800 to 1,200 m above the floor of the valley, but a well entrenched force could ensure that any enemy advance up those roads could only be attempted at great cost.

This Command was involved in many wars include 48, 67, Battle of Karameh, War of Attrition and war against the Syrian army when he tried to enter Jordan in Black September event.

In 2018, two armored brigades (40th, 60th) and some units have been transferred from deactivated 3rd Armored Division to the central command.

Organisation 
The Central Command controls regional units from the Dead Sea to the Zarqa River north of Salt. The Current head of Central Command is Brigadier General Adnan Ahmed Al-Raqqad.

Central Command HQ 

 Command Staff
 HQ Defense Company
 Command Communication Group
 Command Military Police

Border Guard Force (BGF) 

 3rd Border Guard Force Battalion

Combat & Maneuver Units 

 Royal Guard 1st Mechanized Infantry Brigade
 Brigade HQ
 Command Staff
 Joint Fires Coordination Cell - Targeting Cell
 Signal Company
 Medical Center 
 Vehicles & Weapons Maintenance Workshop
 Chemical Support Platoon (Attached)
 JTAC Team
1st Royal Armored Battalion (M60A3)
Royal Guard 1st Mechanized Infantry Battalion (M113A2 MK1)
Royal Guard 2nd Mechanized Infantry Battalion (M113A2 MK1)
17th Field Artillery Battalion (M109A3)
 62nd Field Air Defense Battalion (Shilka,Strela-10,Igla)
Anti-Armor Company (Kornet-E)

 Al Hashemi 51st Mechanized Infantry Brigade
 Brigade HQ
 Command Staff
 Joint Fires Coordination Cell - Targeting Cell
 Signal Company
 Medical Center 
 Vehicles & Weapons Maintenance Workshop
 Chemical Support Platoon (Attached)
 JTAC Team
 King Ghazi 6th Mechanized Infantry Battalion (M113A2 MK1)
 Prince Mohammad 9th Mechanized Infantry Battalion (M113A2 MK1)
 Hashemite 10th Mechanized Infantry Battalion (YPR-765 pri)
 9th Field Artillery Battalion (M109A3)
 61st Field Air Defense Battalion (Shilka,Strela-10,Igla)
 Anti-Armor Company (Kornet-E)

 King Hussein 40th Armored Brigade 
 Brigade HQ
 Command Staff
 Joint Fires Coordination Cell - Targeting Cell
 Signal Company
 Medical Center 
 Vehicles & Weapons Maintenance Workshop
 Chemical Support Platoon (Attached)
 JTAC Team
 Prince Hussein bin Abdullah II 1st Armored Infantry Battalion (Marder 1A3)
 2nd Royal Tank Battalion (Leclerc)
 Prince Ali bin Al Hussein 4th Tank Battalion (Leclerc)
 King Ali 5th Armored Infantry Battalion (Marder 1A3)
 7th Field Artillery Battalion (M109A3)
 4th Field Air Defense Battalion (Shilka,Strela-10,Igla)
 Anti-Armor Company (M901 ITV) 

 Prince Hassan 60th Wheeled Armored Brigade 
 Brigade HQ
 Command Staff
 Joint Fires Coordination Cell - Targeting Cell
 Signal Company
 Medical Center 
 Vehicles & Weapons Maintenance Workshop
 Chemical Support Platoon (Attached)
 JTAC Team
 Royal Guard 3rd Wheeled Infantry Battalion (RG-33L)
 3rd "Scorpion" Royal Tank Battalion (B1 Centauro)
 5th "Elephant" Royal Tank Battalion (B1 Centauro)
 23rd Field Artillery Battalion (M109A3)[1]
 73rd Field Air Defense Battalion (Shilka,Strela-10,Igla)
 Anti-Armor Company (M901 ITV)

Combat Support Units 
 Central Command Artillery [2]
 Command Artillery HQ
 STA Company 
 Prince Hashim 20th Heavy Artillery Battalion (M110A2)
 4th Field Air Defense Brigade [2]
 Brigade HQ
 Signal Company
 Command Engineer Battalion
 4 Mechanized Engineer Companies [3]
 General Support Company

Service Support Units 
 Supply and Transport Battalion
 4 Supply & Transport Companies [3] 
 Command Maintenance Group
 Medical Support Group 
 Administrative Transport Group

Command Training Center 
Notes:
 M109A3 will be replaced by truck mounted artillery
 Subordinate battalions attached to combat brigades
 Each company supports a brigade

Unit Summary

References 

Military of Jordan